The Magpie Café is a seafood restaurant in Whitby, North Yorkshire, England. It was established in 1937, but its building dates back to the 18th century, when it was a merchant's house.

History

The restaurant is known for its fish and chips and as a "bloody good fish and chip shop". The restaurant won a Coast Award for being best fish and chip shop of 2007. The restaurant has faced complaints from local businesses for its long queues. It sources its fish from the local Fishery Lockers Fish.

Ian Robson, the current owner, began working there as a fish fryer in 1979.

Fires

Two fires in the space of 24 hours caused the Magpie Café to close for repairs in May 2017, reopening in December 2017. The first fire started at 10 pm on 30 April 2017, seven fire engines attended. It was likely caused by a grease build up in an electrical extraction flue in the roof, it damaged the top floor customer toilets. The second fire started at 2:30 pm, this time completely gutted the restaurant roof and lower floors except the kitchen and take away shop. The cause was likely pointed to burning embers not extinguished the day before. In July 2017, a major repair began to rebuild the restaurant before it reopened in December that same year.

See also
 List of fish and chip restaurants
 List of seafood restaurants

References

External links 

Official website
Review in The Observer

Companies based in the Borough of Scarborough
Fish and chip restaurants
Tourist attractions in North Yorkshire
Seafood restaurants in the United Kingdom
Restaurants in Yorkshire
Whitby
1937 establishments in England
Restaurants established in 1937